The 2020 Sacred Heart Pioneers football team represented Sacred Heart University as a member of the Northeast Conference (NEC) in the 2020–21 NCAA Division I FCS football season. They were led by eighth-year head coach Mark Nofri and played their home games at Campus Field.

Previous season

The Pioneers finished the 2019 season 7–5, 4–3 in NEC play to finish tied for third place.

Schedule
Sacred Heart had games scheduled against Stony Brook (September 26) and Penn (October 10), which were later canceled before the start of the 2020 season.

References

Sacred Heart
Sacred Heart Pioneers football seasons
Northeast Conference football champion seasons
Sacred Heart
Sacred Heart Pioneers football